Pedro Joaquín Coldwell  (born August 5, 1950 in Cozumel, Quintana Roo) is a Mexican politician affiliated with the Institutional Revolutionary Party (PRI).

Personal life and education
Joaquín Coldwell studied law at the Universidad Iberoamericana.  He is the son of Nassin Joaquín Ibarra, a businessman from Cozumel. He is of Lebanese and English descent. His older sister is Addy Joaquín Coldwell, who is also active in political circles.

Political career
Joaquín Coldwell has occupied different positions within the PRI and in the public service.  He has been director general of the Fondo Nacional para el Desarrollo Turístico (FONATUR) and general secretary of his party. 
From 1979 to 1980, he held a seat in the Chamber of Deputies, representing Quintana Roo's First District. 
He served as Governor of Quintana Roo from 1981 to 1987.  President Carlos Salinas de Gortari appointed him Secretary of Tourism in 1990.  Joaquín Coldwell succeeded Marco A. Bernal as Peace and Reconciliation Commissioner in Chiapas.  In 1998 President Ernesto Zedillo Ponce de León appointed him  Ambassador to Cuba.

In the general election of July 2, 2006, he was elected to the Senate for the PRI, representing the state of Quintana Roo.

References

1950 births
Living people
Politicians from Quintana Roo
Governors of Quintana Roo
Members of the Chamber of Deputies (Mexico) for Quintana Roo
Mexican people of English descent
Mexican people of Lebanese descent
Mexican Secretaries of Tourism
Institutional Revolutionary Party politicians
People from Cozumel
Mexican Secretaries of Energy
21st-century Mexican politicians
Honorary Knights Commander of the Order of the British Empire
20th-century Mexican politicians
Universidad Iberoamericana alumni
Members of the Congress of Quintana Roo
Members of the Senate of the Republic (Mexico) for Quintana Roo